Haroldswick or Harold's Wick (Old Norse: Haraldsvík, 'Harald's bay'), is on Unst, Shetland Islands, Scotland, and is one of the most northerly settlements in the British Isles.

History
The wick takes its name from the Viking King Harald I Fairhair, and is reputed to be the first landing point for the Vikings in the Shetland Islands. A Viking grave, attributed to Harold, has been found on the nearby Setter's Hill, overlooking the landing point.

Geography
It sits at the end of a small bay in a crescent moon shape with a hill on either side, with steep cliffs and rough waters with good mackerel fishing grounds underneath. The beach is rocky until it comes to an old ruin of a pier, then it has huge boulders blocking traveller's way. Lining the beach are little cottages with their only barrier against the winds from the sea being a small wall on the other side of the road. A small maritime museum dedicated to the traditional small boats of Shetland, the Unst Boat Haven, is located at the head of the bay and is open to visitors from May to September. The beach is frequently populated with grey seals and grey herons. The depth is shallow for about 6 metres, then deepens considerably.

Location

The Methodist Church at Haroldswick is the northernmost church in Britain.

For many years, Haroldswick Post Office was the most northerly in the UK and visitors could get a special postmark. Since the office's closure in 1999, this record is now held by the post office in Baltasound, also on Unst.

References

External links

Undiscovered Scotland - Haroldswick
Unst Heritage Centre, Haroldswick

Villages in Unst
Harald Fairhair